Flickers is a British television series which was originally broadcast on ITV in 1980. A comedy drama it stars Bob Hoskins as a pioneering filmmaker and Frances de la Tour as the wealthy, middle-class woman who backs his ambitions. Some critics compared it negatively with Pennies from Heaven which had also starred Hoskins.

Main cast
 Bob Hoskins as Arnie Cole
 Frances de la Tour as Maud
 Fraser Cains as Llewellyn
 Philip Madoc as Jack Brewer
 Sheila Reid as Lily Brewer
 Dickie Arnold as Corky Brown
 Valerie Holliman as Cora Brown
 Granville Saxton as Max Legendre
 Jim Hooper as Percy Bowden
 Joanna Foster as  Clara Brewer
 Teresa Codling as Dotty Brewer
 Tom Cotcher as Hector
 Sheri Shepstone as Violet
 Peggy Ann Wood as Nanny
 Sherrie Hewson as Letty
 Patrick Gordon as  Gilbert Winslow
 Maxine Audley as  Gwendoline Harper
 Andy de la Tour as  Clive

References

Bibliography
 Moline, Karen  Bob Hoskins: An Unlikely Hero. Sidgwick & Jackson, 1988.

External links
 

1980 British television series debuts
1980 British television series endings
1980s British comedy television series
ITV comedy
English-language television shows
Television shows produced by Associated Television (ATV)